Sabit İnce (born 27 August 1954 in Nevşehir) is a Turkish poet, writer and Islamic scholar.

Early life 

He graduated from the Political Sciences Faculty of Marmara University.

Career

He was the editor-in-chief of the Papirus literary magazine. Sabit Ince is a member of the Second New Generation of Turkish poetry, an abstract and postmodern movement created as a backlash against the more popular-based Anadolu Hececileri movement. Love, mainly through its erotic entity, is a popular theme of ince's works. Sabit's poems and articles were published in magazines including Tore, Devlet, Deniz Postası, Bizim Anadolu , Tercüman, Hergün, Ortadogu, Kayseri Hakimiyet and Yeni Kayseri .
"son dakika newspaper"

See also 
 List of contemporary Turkish poets

References 
* Biography and bibliography of Sabit İnce  biyografi.net

External links 

 Biography and bibliography of Sabit İnce  Antoloji.com 
 Biography and bibliography of Sabit İnce  biyografi.net 

1954 births
Living people
People from Nevşehir
Marmara University alumni
Turkish poets
Turkish novelists
Turkish journalists
Turkish Muslims
Turkish folklorists